David Edward Jones (born 5 March 1936) is a Welsh former professional footballer who played as a winger. He made appearances in the English football league for Wrexham and Crewe Alexandra.

References

1936 births
Living people
People from Saltney
Sportspeople from Flintshire
Welsh footballers
Association football wingers
Wrexham A.F.C. players
Crewe Alexandra F.C. players
Bangor City F.C. players
English Football League players